Nagydorog is a village in Tolna County, Hungary.

Nagydorog is the birthplace of actress Vilma Bánky (1901–1991).

External links 
 Street map 

Populated places in Tolna County